South Bend Lions Football Club is an American soccer club based in South Bend, Indiana, that plays in USL League Two, the American semi-professional soccer league. The club was established on November 18, 2019 and will begin their first professional season in 2020, participating in the league's Great Lakes Division.

History
On November 18, 2019, it was announced by USL League Two that South Bend Lions FC would be the newest team to join the league for their 2020 season, joining the Great Lakes Division. The logos and colors for the club were also unveiled at a press conference held in South Bend's County-City Building. Ritchie Jeune was introduced as the club's owner while Thiago Pinto, the head coach of Bethel University's soccer team, was introduced as the club's technical director. During the press conference, Jeune stated that South Bend was one of "three or four different locations" that his team visited before deciding to form a team in the city.

Ownership
The club's owner is Ritchie Jeune, who is also the principal owner of Kettering Town, in England's National League North, Shantou Lions FC, a club based in China, and Pickering FC in Canada's League1 Ontario.

Management team

Current Roster

Statistics and records

Season-by-season

Youth development
During the club's opening press conference, it was announced that they would be opening an under-18 side which would help provide players for the first-team.

See also
 USL League Two

References

External links

 

Soccer clubs in Indiana
Association football clubs established in 2019
2019 establishments in Indiana
USL League Two teams
Sports in South Bend, Indiana